In the maxilla, occasionally two additional canals are present in the middle line of the palatine process; they are termed the foramina of Scarpa, and when present transmit the nasopalatine nerves, the left passing through the anterior, and the right through the posterior canal.

See also
 Antonio Scarpa – anatomist

References

External links
 

Foramina of the skull